Golf at the Pacific Games has been contested since 1969 when the sport was included as one of fifteen sports at the Third South Pacific Games held in Port Moresby, Papua New Guinea. Men's and women's tournaments are contested by teams of four golfers per country, and medals are awarded for individual and team winners. Golf has also been included in many of the Pacific Mini Games, starting with the second edition held at Rarotonga in 1985.

Pacific Games
Flag icons indicate the nationality of the gold medal winner of an event, where this information is known; otherwise an (X) is used. A dash (–) indicates an event that was not contested.

Pacific Mini Games

See also
Golf at the Summer Olympics

Notes

References
 

 
Pacific Games
Pacific Games